The TSV Kleinrinderfeld is a German association football club from the town of Kleinrinderfeld, Bavaria.

The club's greatest success came in 2012 when it qualified for the new northern division of the expanded Bayernliga, the fifth tier of the German football league system but it lasted for only one season at this level before being relegated again.

History
For most of its history the club has been a non-descript amateur side in local Bavarian football. The club was formed as ATSV Kleinrinderfeld in 1923 as a working men's sports club. Because of this background ATSV was outlawed by the Nazis in 1933 and it took until 1937 for a new club to be granted permission to form, the TSV Kleinrinderfeld.

From 1990 onwards the club played in the Bezirksliga Unterfranken-Mitte. It changed to the western division in 1993 and earned promotion to the Bezirksoberliga for the first time.

Kleinrinderfeld played for two seasons in the Bezirksoberliga Unterfranken from 1994 to 1996, finishing third in its first year but being relegated the season after. It made an immediate return to the Bezirksoberliga in 1997 and played another four seasons at this level, now with a seventh place as its best result. Relegated again in 2001 the club would not return to this league for the next seven seasons.

After two seasons in the Bezirksliga Kleinrinderfeld dropped down to the Kreisliga for a season in 2003 but made an immediate return. Another four Bezirksliga seasons followed before a league title took the club back up to the Bezirksoberliga.

After promotion back to the Bezirksoberliga in 2008 Kleinrindefeld played the next three seasons in this league, achieving good results, culminating in a runners-up finish in 2011 and promotion to the Landesliga.

The club played the 2011–12 season in the Landesliga Bayern-Nord and came seventh which was sufficient to qualify it for the new northern division of the expanded Bayernliga. TSV lasted for only one season at this level, finishing last and being relegated to the Landesliga Bayern-Nordwest, where it plays today.

Honours
The club's honours:
 Bezirksoberliga Unterfranken
 Runners-up: 2011
 Bezirksliga Unterfranken
 Champions: 2008
 Runners-up: 1992, 1994, 2002, 2007

Recent seasons
The recent season-by-season performance of the club:

With the introduction of the Bezirksoberligas in 1988 as the new fifth tier, below the Landesligas, all leagues below dropped one tier. With the introduction of the Regionalligas in 1994 and the 3. Liga in 2008 as the new third tier, below the 2. Bundesliga, all leagues below dropped one tier. With the establishment of the Regionalliga Bayern as the new fourth tier in Bavaria in 2012 the Bayernliga was split into a northern and a southern division, the number of Landesligas expanded from three to five and the Bezirksoberligas abolished. All leagues from the Bezirksligas onwards were elevated one tier.

Key

References

External links 
 Official team site  
 Das deutsche Fußball-Archiv  historical German domestic league tables 
 Manfreds Fussball Archiv  Tables and results from the Bavarian amateur leagues
 TSV Kleinrinderfeld at Weltfussball.de 

Football clubs in Germany
Football clubs in Bavaria
Football in Lower Franconia
Association football clubs established in 1923
1923 establishments in Germany
Sports clubs banned by the Nazis
Würzburg (district)